Dina Merrill (born Nedenia Marjorie Hutton; December 29, 1923 – May 22, 2017) was an American actress, heiress, socialite, businesswoman, and philanthropist.

Early life
Merrill was born in New York City on December 29, 1923, but for many years, her date of birth was given as December 9, 1925. She was the only child of Post Cereals heiress Marjorie Merriweather Post and her second husband, Wall Street stockbroker Edward Francis Hutton, founder of E. F. Hutton & Co. Merrill had two older half-sisters, Adelaide Brevoort Close (July 26, 1908 – December 31, 1998) and Eleanor Post Hutton (December 3, 1909 – November 27, 2006), by her mother's first marriage to Edward Bennett Close, grandfather of actress Glenn Close.

Merrill graduated from Miss Porter's School, then attended George Washington University in Washington, DC for one term, but then enrolled at the American Academy of Dramatic Arts in New York City. She studied acting at HB Studio under Uta Hagen.

Acting career
On advice from her half-sister's (then) husband, she adopted the stage name Dina Merrill, borrowing from Charles E. Merrill, a famous stockbroker like her father.  Merrill made her debut on the stage in the play The Mermaid Singing in 1945.

During the late 1950s and 1960s, Merrill was believed to have been marketed as a replacement for Grace Kelly, and in 1959, she was proclaimed "Hollywood's new Grace Kelly".

Merrill's film credits included Desk Set (1957), A Nice Little Bank That Should Be Robbed (1958), Don't Give Up the Ship (1959), Operation Petticoat (1959, with Cary Grant, who had been married to her cousin, Woolworth heiress Barbara Hutton), The Sundowners (1960), Butterfield 8 (1960), The Young Savages (1961), The Courtship of Eddie's Father (1963), I'll Take Sweden (1965), The Greatest (1977), A Wedding (1978), Just Tell Me What You Want (1980), Anna to the Infinite Power (1983), Twisted (1986), Caddyshack II (1988), Fear (1990), True Colors (1991), The Player (1992), Suture (1993), and Shade (2003). She also appeared in made-for-TV movies, such as Seven in Darkness (1969), The Lonely Profession (1969), Family Flight (1972), and The Tenth Month (1979).

Merrill appeared in numerous television series in the 1960s, such as playing the villain Calamity Jan in two 1968 episodes of Batman with then-husband Cliff Robertson. She also made guest appearances on two Bonanza episodes as Susannah Clauson, The Alfred Hitchcock Hour episode "Bonfire" (1962), The Investigators, The Bold Ones, Wagon Train (1964), Mission: Impossible, The Love Boat; Quincy, M.E.; Murder, She Wrote; Roseanne, and The Nanny, as Maxwell Sheffield's disapproving and distant British mother. In 1971, Merrill appeared as Laura Duff in The Men from Shiloh (rebranded name for the TV Western The Virginian) in the episode titled "The Angus Killer".

Her stage credits include the 1983 Broadway revival of the Rodgers and Hart musical On Your Toes, starring Russian prima ballerina Natalia Makarova. In 1991, she appeared in the rotating cast of the off-Broadway staged reading of Wit & Wisdom.

In 1991, Merrill and her third husband Ted Hartley merged their company Pavilion Communications with RKO to form RKO Pictures, which owns the intellectual property of the RKO Radio Pictures movie studio.

In the 1960s and 1970s, Merrill was a recurring guest on several network television game and panel shows, including Match Game, To Tell the Truth, What's My Line, and Hollywood Squares.

Board memberships
Merrill was a presidential appointee to the board of trustees of the John F. Kennedy Center for the Performing Arts, a trustee of the Eugene O'Neill Theater Center, and a vice president of the New York City Mission Society. In 1980, Merrill joined the board of directors of her father's E. F. Hutton & Co., continuing on the board and the compensation committee of Lehman Brothers when it acquired Hutton, for over 18 years.

Personal life

Merrill was married three times. In 1946, she wed Stanley M. Rumbough Jr., an heir to the Colgate-Palmolive toothpaste fortune and entrepreneur. They had three children, Nedenia Colgate Rumbough; David Post Rumbough; and Stanley Rumbough, III, before divorcing in 1966. Later that year, she wed actor Cliff Robertson, with whom she had a daughter, Heather Robertson. The couple divorced in 1986.

In 1989, she married producer Ted Hartley.

On May 22, 2017, Merrill died at her home in East Hampton, New York at age 93. She had been suffering from dementia with Lewy bodies.

Two of Merrill's four children predeceased her.

Honors
Merrill received the Women's International Center (WIC) Living Legacy Award, in 1994, and a lifetime achievement award from the American Academy of Dramatic Arts in April 2005.

Filmography

Feature films

Television films

Television

References

External links

In Step with: Dina Merrill, news.google.com; accessed 2014-07-09. 
Cliff Robertson & Dina Merrill Take (summer) Stock and Are Bullish on the Outcome People Magazine 1981-07-31

1923 births
2017 deaths
20th-century American actresses
21st-century American actresses
Actresses from New York City
American billionaires
American Academy of Dramatic Arts alumni
American film actresses
American musical theatre actresses
American stage actresses
American television actresses
Philanthropists from New York (state)
American socialites
American debutantes
California Republicans
Deaths from dementia in New York (state)
Deaths from Lewy body dementia
Florida Republicans
George Washington University alumni
Hutton family
Miss Porter's School alumni
New York (state) Republicans
People from Palm Beach, Florida